Edmunds Sprūdžs (born 21 June 1980 in Riga) is a Latvian politician and businessman. He is the former Minister for the Environmental Protection and Regional Development of Latvia and a member of the Reform Party.

Career 
He was elected to the Saeima at the 2011 parliamentary election. He was the Reform Party's candidate for Prime Minister at the 2011 election. 

Sprūdžs was appointed Minister for the Environmental Protection and Regional Development in October 2011.

As of 2017, he is known to be involved in various businesses at the center of "Small Wonderland" in Sigulda, where townships are modeled with train models drive on rails, miniature cars roll on the streets residential houses and depot buildings.

References

External links
 Central Election Commission of Latvia profile 
 Personal blog of Edmunds Sprūdžs 

1980 births
Living people
Politicians from Riga
Reform Party (Latvia) politicians
Ministers of Regional Development and Local Governments of Latvia
Deputies of the 11th Saeima
Businesspeople from Riga
Riga State Gymnasium No.1 alumni